Elmar Weindel (born 1929) is a retired German Ambassador.

In 1960, Weindel entered the Foreign Service. From 1963 to 1967, he was employed in Lisbon. From 1968 to 1975, he was employed in Tehran.

From  to 1981 he was ambassador in Maputo. From 1982 to 1983, he was Ambassador to Abu Dhabi.

From 1984 to 1990, he was employed at the Facility management of the Federal Foreign Office. In mid August 1987 he led a delegation to the Rruga Skënderbeg to establish the West German embassy in Tirana.

From 1991 to 1994 he had Exequatur as Consul General in San Francisco. In 1994, Weindel retired.

References

1929 births
Living people
Ambassadors of Germany to Mozambique
Ambassadors to the United Arab Emirates